The Institut d'Astrophysique de Paris (translated: Paris Institute of Astrophysics) is a research institute in Paris, France. The Institute is part of the Sorbonne University and is associated with the CNRS Centre national de la recherche scientifique.  It is located at 98bis, Boulevard Arago Il in the 14th arrondissement of Paris, adjacent to the Paris Observatory.

History 
The IAP was created in 1936 by the French ministry of education under Jean Zay, initially for the purpose of processing data received from the Observatory of Haute-Provence, which was created at the same time. Construction of the building started on 6 January 1938. On 15 June 1939, Henri Mineur became the institute's first director. IAP scientists were at first  located in Paris Observatory, then in the École normale supérieure de Paris before arriving in the current building in 1944 which was finally completed in 1952.

Current research
The IAP includes 160 researchers, engineers, technicians, and administrators and regularly welcomes many visitors and students.

The main areas of research at the IAP are:

 General relativity and cosmology
 Cosmological structure formation
 High-energy astrophysics 	
 Origin and evolution of galaxies
 Stellar structure
 Exoplanets

The IAP is one of five laboratories of AERA, the European association for research in astronomy. The laboratory is situated at the interface between two disciplines, astrophysics and theoretical physics. The International Astronomical Union has its seat at the IAP.

Directors
 1936-1954 : Henri Mineur
 1954-1960 : André Danjon
 1960-1971 : André Lallemand
 1972-1977 : Jean-Claude Pecker
 1978-1989 : Jean Audouze
 1990-1998 : Alain Omont
 1998-2004 : Bernard Fort
 2005-2013 : Laurent Vigroux
 Since 2014 : Francis Bernardeau

References

External links
Official website

Astronomy institutes and departments
Research institutes in France
Astrophysics institutes
French National Centre for Scientific Research